The Treason Act (Ireland) 1765 (5 Geo 3 c. 21 (I.)) was an Act of the former Parliament of Ireland which gave defendants in trials for high treason under the Treason Act 1351 the right to be represented by counsel and the right to be given a copy of the indictment in advance of their trial. (These rights had been available under English law since the Treason Act 1695, and under Scottish law since that Act was extended to Scotland by the Treason Act 1708.) The Act's long title was An Act for the better regulating of trials in cases of high treason under the statute of the twenty fifth of Edward the third (sic). It was repealed by the Treason Act 1945, by which time it had long been obsolete.

See also

Treason Act
Treason (Ireland) Act 1821

References
The Irish Statutes 1310–1800 Revised edition, Dublin: Round Hall Press, 1995, page 532

Acts of the Parliament of Ireland (pre-1801)
1765 in law
Law of Northern Ireland
1765 in Ireland
Repealed Irish legislation